Parklands is a suburb of Cape Town, South Africa.  It is near Blouberg, bordered by Tableview, Cape Town and is part of the Western Seaboard residential district.

Parklands is one of the fastest-growing residential developments in the Western Cape. It is characterised by lower-density suburban areas and higher-density apartment block areas; the latter are largely inhabited by African diaspora residents.

References

Suburbs of Cape Town